This is a list of current and former varsity ice hockey programs that played under NCAA guidelines and/or predated the NCAA's oversight of ice hockey.

Current teams

Time in the NAIA is included for any team so long as they played at the varsity level.as of June 24, 2022.

Division I

Men's

Women's

Division II

Men's

Women's
No women's ice hockey programs currently play under Division II regulations. The NCAA allows D-II members to play under Division I regulations in any sport that does not have a D-II national championship, and all D-II members that sponsor varsity women's hockey choose to play as D-I.

Of the six schools that play under D-II regulations in men's ice hockey, four currently have women's varsity teams, all of which play in the NEWHA. Assumption will start women's varsity play in 2023–24 as a NEWHA member.

Division III

Men's

† UMass Boston's program began in 1980, however, the school merged in 1982 with Boston State College, which had started its ice hockey program in 1962.

Women's

Future teams

Division I

Men's

Women's

Division III

Men's

Women's

Former teams
Defunct teams are listed at the level and in the conference they were when they ceased sponsoring ice hockey as a varsity sport.

Division I

Men's

Women's

Division II

Men's

Division III

Men's

See also

Timeline

Legend

Pre-NCAA Tournament

Men's programs starting thru 1918

Men's programs starting from 1919 thru 1945

References

Ice Hockey
NCAA Division I ice hockey
Programs